This article is about the particular significance of the year 1878 to Wales and its people.

Incumbents

Archdruid of the National Eisteddfod of Wales – Clwydfardd

Lord Lieutenant of Anglesey – William Owen Stanley 
Lord Lieutenant of Brecknockshire – Joseph Bailey, 1st Baron Glanusk
Lord Lieutenant of Caernarvonshire – Edward Douglas-Pennant, 1st Baron Penrhyn 
Lord Lieutenant of Cardiganshire – Edward Pryse
Lord Lieutenant of Carmarthenshire – John Campbell, 2nd Earl Cawdor 
Lord Lieutenant of Denbighshire – William Cornwallis-West  
Lord Lieutenant of Flintshire – Hugh Robert Hughes
Lord Lieutenant of Glamorgan – Christopher Rice Mansel Talbot 
Lord Lieutenant of Merionethshire – Edward Lloyd-Mostyn, 2nd Baron Mostyn
Lord Lieutenant of Monmouthshire – Henry Somerset, 8th Duke of Beaufort
Lord Lieutenant of Montgomeryshire – Edward Herbert, 3rd Earl of Powis
Lord Lieutenant of Pembrokeshire – William Edwardes, 4th Baron Kensington
Lord Lieutenant of Radnorshire – Arthur Walsh, 2nd Baron Ormathwaite 

Bishop of Bangor – James Colquhoun Campbell
Bishop of Llandaff – Alfred Ollivant 
Bishop of St Asaph – Joshua Hughes 
Bishop of St Davids – Basil Jones

Events
March 
The 'basic' process, enabling the use of phosphoric iron ore in steelmaking, developed at the failing Blaenavon Ironworks by Percy Gilchrist and Sidney Gilchrist Thomas, is first made public.
The Swansea Improvements and Tramway Company SITC) opens a street tramway from Gower Street, Swansea, to join up with the Oystermouth Railway.
16–17 July – Spanish seaman Joseph Garcia, just released from Usk Prison, murders all 5 members of the Watkins family at Llangybi, Monmouthshire.
17 July – Swansea tramways are forced by legal action to return to horse-drawn operation after experimenting with steam locomotives.
11 September – In a mining accident at the Prince of Wales Colliery, Abercarn, 268 men are killed.
Founding of Dr Williams School for Girls at Dolgellau with Eliza Ann Fewings as first head.
Opening of Marine Drive around the Great Orme at Llandudno.
A passenger ferry service is established between Bangor and Porthaethwy on the Menai Strait.
Industrialist John Corbett buys Ynysymaengwyn.
Slate industry in Wales: The Oakeley quarry at Blaenau Ffestiniog absorbs the previously independently-worked Upper and Middle quarries.
The prison system in Wales is nationalised and brought under centralised government control.
Nanteos Cup first exhibited.

Arts and literature

New books
Daniel Silvan Evans – Celtic Remains
William Rees (Gwilym Hiraethog) – Llythyrau 'Rhen Ffarmwr

Music
John Owen (Owain Alaw) – Jeremiah (oratorio)

Sport
Football – The Welsh Cup competition takes place for the first time, and is won by Wrexham.

Births
4 January – Augustus John, painter (died 1961)
30 January – Reg Skrimshire, Wales and British Lions rugby union player (died 1963)
24 February – Lou Phillips, Wales international rugby player (killed in action 1916)
3 March – Edward Thomas, poet (killed in action 1917)
12 March – Mary Sophia Allen, women's rights activist (died 1964)
15 March – Thomas Richards, historian and librarian (died 1962)
21 March – Edwin Thomas Maynard, Wales international rugby player (died 1961)
16 April – Owen Thomas Jones, geologist (died 1967)
26 May – Abel J. Jones, writer (died 1949)
5 June – Billy O'Neill, Wales national rugby player (died 1955)
8 June – Evan Roberts, religious revivalist (died 1951)
20 June – Seymour Farmer, politician in Canada (died 1951)
1 July – Billy Trew, rugby player and Welsh Triple Crown winning captain (died 1926)
27 August – Edgar Rees Jones, lawyer and politician (died 1962)
28 October – Charles Benjamin Redrup, aeronautical engineer (died 1961)
30 October – Caradog Roberts, musician (died 1935)
8 November – Dorothea Bate, palaeontologist (died 1951)
31 December – Caradoc Evans, writer (died 1945)
date unknown – Richard Hughes Williams (Dic Tryfan), Welsh language short story writer (died 1919)

Deaths
16 February – Alexander Jones, footballer, 23 (accidentally shot) 
25 February – Townsend Harris, Welsh-descended American diplomat, 73
30 March – Peter Maurice, priest and writer, 74
4 July – William Roos, Welsh artist and engraver, 70
13 August – Francis Rice, 5th Baron Dynevor, 74
30 September – Evan James, poet, lyricist of the Welsh national anthem, 69
18 November – John Jones (Mathetes), clergyman and writer, 57
20 November – William Thomas (Islwyn), poet, 46
25 November – Llewelyn Lewellin, clergyman and academic, 80
5 December – David Price, minister, 67
13 December – David Charles, secretary of the University for Wales movement, 56

References

 
Wales